The digastric fossa of the mandible is an anatomical region which occupies a space on the inner surface of the inferior border of the body of the mandible, near the midline bilaterally. It is a position of attachment of the anterior belly of the digastric muscle.

References

Human anatomy